Pacientka Dr. Hegla is a 1940 Czechoslovak drama film directed by Otakar Vávra.

Cast
 Adina Mandlová as Karla Janotová
 Otomar Korbelář as Dr. Jindrich Hegl
 Svetla Svozilová as Dr. Hegl's wife
 Zorka Janů as Dr. Hegl's daughter Ela
 Svatopluk Beneš as Dr. Jaroslav Kriz
 Jaroslav Průcha as Pharmacist Janota
 Zdeňka Baldová as Mrs. Janota
 Gustav Hilmar as Mr. Kriz
 Růžena Šlemrová as Mrs. Kriz
 Jana Ebertová as Milada Svarcová

References

External links
 

1940 films
1940 drama films
1940s Czech-language films
Czechoslovak black-and-white films
Films directed by Otakar Vávra
Czechoslovak drama films
1940s Czech films